Thomas Henry Keell (24 September 1866 – 26 June 1938) was an English compositor who edited the anarchist periodical Freedom. In 1907, he attended the International Anarchist Congress of Amsterdam, where he was hailed by Emma Goldman as "one of our most devoted workers on the London Freedom". Keell also contributed to Voice of Labour for many years and was an outspoken opponent of the First World War. He was arrested with his companion Lilian Wolfe during a 1916 raid on the Freedom offices; they were imprisoned and later lived together in Whiteway Colony in Gloucestershire from the 1920s until Keell's death in 1938.

See also 

List of anarchist periodicals
Manifesto of the Sixteen

Footnotes

References 

1866 births
1938 deaths
English anarchists
Politicians from London